Yuji Ito may refer to

Yuji Ito (footballer), Japanese football player
Yuji Ito (fighter), Japanese mixed martial artist